Carlos de Cárdenas Plá (born 7 July 1932) is a yachtsman from Cuba. He won a silver medal in the men's Star class at the 1948 Summer Olympics in London.

References

1932 births
Olympic silver medalists for Cuba
Sailors at the 1948 Summer Olympics – Star
Sailors at the 1952 Summer Olympics – Star
Sailors at the 1960 Summer Olympics – Star
Living people
Olympic sailors of Cuba
Cuban male sailors (sport)
Medalists at the 1948 Summer Olympics
Star class world champions
World champions in sailing for Cuba